Kohneh Deh is a village in Nesa Rural District, Asara District, Karaj County, Alborz Province, Iran. At the 2006 census, its population was 131, in 37 families.

References 

Populated places in Karaj County